Pratibha Paul is an Indian television actress, who appears in television series like Dil Dosti Dance, Bhanwar, Bharat Ka Veer Putra – Maharana Pratap and Aahat (season 6).

Television
Channel V's Dil Dosti Dance
Sony TV's Bhanwar, Bharat Ka Veer Putra – Maharana Pratap and Aahat (season 6)

References

Indian television actresses
Actresses in Hindi television
Living people
Year of birth missing (living people)